The College of Architecture, Art, and Planning (AAP) at Cornell University is one of the world's most highly regarded and prestigious schools of architecture and has the only department in the Ivy League that offers the Bachelor of Architecture degree.  According to DesignIntelligence, Cornell architecture students are the most desired recent graduates by architecture firms, especially in New York City. The department has one of the largest endowments of any architecture program, including a $20 million endowment by Cayuga County resident Ruth Price Thomas in 2002. The Master of Regional Planning (M.R.P.) professional degree program at AAP has been consistently ranked in the top 10 in the nation, according to Planetizen's Guide to Graduate Urban Planning Programs.

Among the college's notable alumni are architects Richard Meier (B.Arch. '56), designer of the Getty Center in Los Angeles, and Peter Eisenman (B.Arch. '55), founder of the Institute for Architecture and Urban Studies in New York City; artists Charles Ginnever (M.F.A. '59), Louise Lawler (B.F.A. '69), Susan Rothenberg (B.F.A. '67) and James Siena (B.F.A. '79); architect and planner Edmund Bacon (B.Arch. '32), and planners Paul Farmer (M.R.P. '71), Norman Krumholz (M.R.P. '65), and Robert Mier (M.R.P. '73, Ph.D. '75).

Departments
The college is divided into three departments: Architecture, Art, and City and Regional Planning. In 2019, the college was the third most selective in the university, with an acceptance rate of 10.25%.

The Department of Architecture is one of the oldest and most respected architecture programs in the United States, offering NAAB-accredited degree programs that provide a foundation in the history, theory and practice of architecture. In addition to the Professional Bachelor of Architecture (B.Arch.) and undergraduate minor, the department offers the following graduate degrees: Professional Master of Architecture (M.Arch.); Post-Professional Master of Science (M.S.) in Advanced Architectural Design; and a Ph.D. in the History of Architecture and Urban Development. The department also offers interdisciplinary and highly technical M.S. degrees in Computer Graphics and Matter Design Computation.

The Department of Art offers four-year Bachelor of Fine Arts (B.F.A.) and two-year Master of Fine Arts (M.F.A.) degrees.  The B.F.A. program requires students to complete coursework in various mediums of visual art, but provides ample opportunity to take classes outside of the department. The M.F.A. program encourages both interdisciplinary and medium-specific practices, depending on the interest of the student.

The Department of City and Regional Planning (CRP) is home to leading programs in planning, historic preservation, and urban and regional studies. These programs are an intensive and intimate community, which have exceptional breadth and integrate different fields of study. Students work closely with a special thesis committee of their choosing that can include faculty members from across the university, allowing for a specialized and unique experience. CRP offers a Bachelor of Science in urban and regional studies (URS) that encompasses an interdisciplinary, liberal arts course of study focused on the forces that shape the social, economic, and political character and physical form of urban/suburban areas and their surrounding regions. CRP also offers an urban and regional studies minor for students not enrolled in the URS program. An accelerated M.R.P. degree option is available to graduates of the URS program. There are a variety of five-year dual degree options available to URS students in fields including engineering, landscape architecture, and natural and social sciences. Additionally, CRP offers an M.A., M.S., and Ph.D. in regional science, and an M.A. in historic preservation planning. Cornell was one of the first institutions in the country to offer preservation classes and is internationally recognized as a leader in the field.

AAP also participates in the Baker Program in Real Estate, a graduate program drawing on faculty from five Cornell colleges, and offered to students from across the university.  Many real estate courses at Cornell are offered by the Department of City and Regional Planning and the School of Hotel Administration.  The Hotel School houses the Baker Program and offers a minor in real estate for undergraduates. Students earning a bachelor's degree at the Hotel School can focus their studies on the design of hospitality and foodservice facilities or the creation of new hotels and restaurants.

History
Cornell University's architecture department was established in 1871 as the School of Architecture with the hiring of Charles Babcock as the first Professor creating the first four-year course of study in architecture in the United States.  Its first graduate, William Henry Miller, Class of 1872, designed many iconic buildings on campus including Risley Hall, Uris Library and adjoining McGraw Tower, the presidential mansion (today known as the A.D. White House), and Boardman Hall, the original home of the Law School. It is currently the smallest of the seven undergraduate colleges and schools, with an undergraduate enrollment of 496 and a faculty of 56.

Facilities

AAP campuses

 Main campus, Cornell University, Ithaca/NY, United States
 AAP NYC, 26 Broadway, New York City/NY, United States
 Cornell in Rome at Palazzo Santacroce, Rome, Italy

The college occupies four buildings on the northern end of the Arts Quad. Located in Sibley Hall are offices for the City and Regional Planning and Architecture departments, the Cornell in Rome program, and the Office of the Dean. The Green Dragon Cafe and student lounge is located in the basement.

Olive Tjaden Hall is used by the Department of Art. It houses painting, drawing, photography and lithography studios, the Art department main office and faculty offices. Rand Hall housed studios and classrooms of the Department of Architecture until 2018 and is being renovated to house the Fine Arts Library and AAP shops. (In 2011, the Fine Arts Library was moved from the Sibley Hall Dome to the top floor of Rand Hall, following a reorganization coinciding with the opening of adjacent Milstein Hall.

Directly behind Sibley, the OMA/Rem Koolhaas and Shohei Shigematsu-designed Milstein Hall (named after Paul Milstein) is a prominent cantilevered structure housing studio space that extends over University Avenue. The LEED-certified building provides an array of features such as a stepped auditorium space for presentations and meetings, crit space, galleries, and a sunken garden. Design for the building was a grueling process, with several architects and a constantly delayed schedule. The unfinished building opened to students in the Fall of 2011, with the ceremonial completion scheduled the following Spring. In January 2013, the American Institute of Architects (AIA) gave Milstein Hall the Honor Award, its highest award. Designed by OMA, Milstein Hall was among 11 buildings in the United States and Canada that received 2013 AIA Honor Awards for Architecture.

Off-campus programs and facilities

The College of Architecture, Art, and Planning runs several off-campus programs. The most prominent of these is the Cornell in Rome Program in which students from all three disciplines, as well as Cornell students from outside AAP, spend one semester in Rome studying ancient to modern practices in architecture, art, and urban planning in classes taught by Cornell professors and Rome-based faculty. The program is housed at the 17th-century Palazzo Santacroce, in the historic center of Rome, minutes from the Pantheon and Piazza Navona. The Department of Planning also offers a winter program on sustainability in Panama, and a summer program on urban development in Brazil.

Additionally, in 2006, the college opened AAP NYC, a  facility near Union Square in New York City, as a work and display space as well as a venue for Cornell events. AAP students can choose to spend 1 semester at AAP NYC, where they take studio and other classes, and are assigned an internship in a major architecture firm due to Cornell's influence and alumni connections.

Rankings

Undergraduate program
The journal DesignIntelligence has consistently ranked Cornell's undergraduate architecture program as No. 1 in the nation in its annual "America's Best Architecture & Design Schools" issue.

*(T) denotes tie

Graduate program
As of 2016, the program's ten-year average ranking, places it 5th, overall, on DesignIntelligence's ranking of programs accredited by the National Architectural Accrediting Board.

Additionally, DesignIntelligence's ten-year median ranking also ranks the program 5th.

*(T) denotes tie

References

External links
 

Architecture, Art, and Planning
Architecture, Art, and Planning
Architecture schools in New York (state)
Art schools in New York (state)
Educational institutions established in 1871
1871 establishments in New York (state)
Urban studies and planning schools